The Voyager Space Station or Voyager Station is a proposed rotating wheel space station, planned to start construction in 2026. The space station aims to be the first commercial space hotel.

Construction of the space station will be handled by Orbital Assembly Corporation. It is proposed that the SpaceX Starship could be used to shuttle space tourists to the Voyager Station, which would accommodate 280 guests and 112 crew members. The cost of a trip to the station has not been officially published, but some estimates are that it would be approximately US$5 million, and would require the passengers to undergo safety and physical training before boarding the shuttle for a  day trip to the space station. The cost of the space station has been estimated to be in the "tens of billions".

With Orbital Assembly now aiming to launch two space stations, Voyager Station is scheduled to accommodate 400 people and to open in 2027, while the smaller, new concept Pioneer Station can house only 28 people, but can be operational from 2025.

See also 
 Aurora Space Station
 Mars One
 List of space stations

References

External links 
 Orbital Assembly
 
 
 
 

Crewed spacecraft
Proposed space stations
2020s in science
Proposed hotels